Volodymyr Koman (born 20 February 1964 in Uzhgorod) is a retired Ukrainian professional footballer.

He is a father of the Hungarian international Vladimir Koman.

In 1983 Koman took part in the Summer Spartakiad of the Peoples of the USSR in the team of Ukrainian SSR.

References

1963 births
Living people
Sportspeople from Uzhhorod
Soviet footballers
Soviet expatriate footballers
Ukrainian footballers
Ukrainian expatriate footballers
Expatriate footballers in Hungary
FC Dynamo Kyiv players
FC Hoverla Uzhhorod players
Szombathelyi Haladás footballers
Association football midfielders